McCulloch County is a county located on the Edwards Plateau in the U.S. state of Texas. At the 2020 census, its population was 7,630. Its county seat is Brady. The county was created in 1856 and later organized in 1876. It is named for Benjamin McCulloch, a famous Texas Ranger and Confederate general.

The geographical center of Texas lies within McCulloch County, near Brady.

History

From 5000 BC to 1500 AD, the early Native American inhabitants included Tonkawa, Lipan Apache, Comanche, and Tawakoni.  The 1788 José Mares expedition passed through the area while travelling from San Antonio to Santa Fe.

On November 21, 1831, in the Brady vicinity, James Bowie, Rezin P. Bowie, David Buchanan, Cephas D. Hamm, Matthew Doyle, Jesse Wallace, Thomas McCaslin, Robert Armstrong, and James Coryell with two servants, Charles and Gonzales, held at bay for a day and a night 164 Caddo and Lipans. After 80 warriors had been killed, the Indians withdrew. Camp San Saba was established in 1852 to protect settlers from Indians.
The Sixth Texas Legislature in 1856 formed McCulloch County from Bexar County, and named it for Benjamin McCulloch. The Voca waterwheel mill was built in 1876.

The Brady Sentinel was established by D.F. Hayes in 1880 as the county's first newspaper. Later, it was absorbed by the Heart o’ Texas News run by R.B. Boyle.
During 1886–1912, the Swedish colonies of East Sweden, West Sweden and Melvin were established. From 1897 to 1910, the Brady Enterprise or McCulloch County Enterprise was published.
In 1899, the McCulloch County sandstone courthouse built in the Romanesque Revival style by architects Martin and Moodie.
In the last year of the 19th century, the Milburn Messenger was edited by T.F. Harwell. Cotton became a major county crop. Three years later, the Fort Worth and Rio Grande Railway came to McCulloch County.
W.D. Currie published the Mercury Mascot from 1904 to 1907. In 1906–1910, the McCulloch County Star was published. In 1909, the Brady Standard, edited by F.W. Schwenker, began publication, and absorbed the McCulloch County Star and the Brady Enterprise in 1910. The Rochelle Record was started by W.D. Cowan in 1909. The Melvin Rustler began publication in 1915. in 1917, J. Marvin Hunter founded the Melvin Enterprise.

During the 1920s, McCulloch County billed itself as "the Turkey Center of the Universe", and held an annual Turkey Trot.

Tenant farming in the county peaked at 60% in the 1930s.

Curtis Field, named for Brady Mayor Harry L. Curtis, opened as a flying school in 1941, with 80 students.   A county prisoner-of-war camp was set up in 1943; it housed members of Rommel's Afrika Corps,  the S.S., and the Gestapo.
Crockett State School took over the former POW camp in 1946, and used it as a training school for delinquent black girls.

From 1954 to 1960, 48 restraining structures were installed in the county to control flooding.   Brady Creek Reservoir was constructed to partially control flooding on Brady Creek in 1963. A tourist information marker placed in the county, declaring the geographical center of Texas.

Geography

Major highways
  U.S. Highway 87
  U.S. Highway 190
  U.S. Highway 283
  U.S. Highway 377
  State Highway 71

Adjacent counties
 Coleman County (north)
 Brown County (northeast)
 San Saba County (east)
 Mason County (south)
 Menard County (southwest)
 Concho County (west)

Demographics

Note: the US Census treats Hispanic/Latino as an ethnic category. This table excludes Latinos from the racial categories and assigns them to a separate category. Hispanics/Latinos can be of any race.

At the 2000 census, 8,205 people, 3,277 households and 2,267 families resided in the county. The population density was 8 per square mile (3/km2). The 4,184 housing units averaged 4 per square mile (2/km2). The racial makeup of the county was 84.64% White, 1.57% Black or African American, 0.26% Native American, 0.17% Asian, 0.01% Pacific Islander, 11.71% from other races, and 1.63% from two or more races. About 27% of the population were Hispanic or Latinos of any race.

Of the 3,277 households, 30.70% had children under the age of 18 living with them, 55.30% were married couples living together, 10.20% had a female householder with no husband present, and 30.80% were not families. About 28.20% of all households were made up of individuals, and 15.80% had someone living alone who was 65 years of age or older. The average household size was 2.47 and the average family size was 3.01. About 26.60% of the population were under the age of 18, 6.60% from 18 to 24, 22.90% from 25 to 44, 24.30% from 45 to 64, and 19.50% who were 65 years of age or older. The median age was 40 years. For every 100 females, there were 90.10 males. For every 100 females age 18 and over, there were 86.00 males.

The median household income was $25,705 and family income was $30,783. Males had a median income of $25,844 versus $18,337 for females. The per capita income for the county was $14,579. About 17.30% of families and 22.50% of the population were below the poverty line, including 28.40% of those under age 18 and 21.50% of those age 65 or over.

Government and infrastructure
In 1947, the State of Texas opened the Brady State School for Negro Girls in McCulloch County, near Brady on a former prisoner of war camp leased from the federal government of the United States. In 1950, the state replaced the Brady facility with the Crockett State School.

Politics

Education
The following school districts serve McCulloch County:
 Brady ISD (small portion in Concho County)
 Lohn ISD
 Mason ISD (mostly in Mason County; small portions in Kimble, Menard, and San Saba Counties)
 Rochelle ISD

Communities

City
 Brady (county seat)

Town
 Melvin

Unincorporated communities

 Doole
 Fife
 Lohn
 Mercury
 Milburn
 Pear Valley
 Placid
 Rochelle
 Salt Gap
 Voca

See also

 List of museums in West Texas
 National Register of Historic Places listings in McCulloch County, Texas
 Recorded Texas Historic Landmarks in McCulloch County
 Old McCulloch County Jail

References

External links
 

 
1876 establishments in Texas
Populated places established in 1876
Texas Hill Country